The British Muslim Awards are an annual award ceremony that honours the success and achievements of British Muslim individuals, groups and businesses. It was established in 2013.

Overview
The British Muslim Awards was founded by Oceanic Consulting. The event honours the success, achievements and contribution of Britain's Muslim individuals, groups and businesses and highlights the significant role Muslims play in contributing to a better Great Britain.

It recognises the achievements of Muslim men and women at the forefront of their communities and industries celebrating the success of individuals, community groups and businesses, highlighting their achievements and recognising various aspects of British society including business, charity, sport, arts, and culture.

2013 event
From October 2012, nominations were encouraged through social media. Following 10,000 nominations nationally, the finalists for the inaugural British Muslim Awards were announced.

The first national British Muslim Awards event took place on 29 January 2013 at the Sheridan Suite in Manchester. The awards were presented by Tasmina Ahmed Sheikh of Hamilton Burns Solicitors and co-hosted by entrepreneur and philanthropist Zulfi Hussain. The Islamic Bank of Britain was the headline sponsor for the event. The awards ceremony was attended by 600 people.

The event also raised money for Mosaic, the largest multi-cause charitable enterprise in the United Kingdom. Founded by Prince Charles in 2007, Mosaic's mentoring programmes create opportunities for young people growing up in the most deprived communities.

Nominees and winners

2014 event
On 14 January 2014, the finalists were announced. The second awards event was held on 31 January 2014 at the Salford City Stadium. The awards were presented by Tasmina Ahmed-Sheikh OBE of Hamilton Burns WS and welcomed over 400 attendees.

The event also raised money for The Well Foundation. Set up in 2008, The Well Foundation aims to raise money to build wells, install hand pumps and establish health and sanitation programs to provide accessible clean water to the stricken regions of the world.

Nominees and winners

2015 event
On 4 December 2014, the finalists were announced for 22 awards.

On 27 January 2015, the third annual awards event presented by Al Rayan Bank (formerly known as Islamic Bank of Britain) was held at the Chateau Impney Hotel in Worcestershire. Over 400 people attended the ceremony, which was presented by award-winning TV chef, Ajmal Mushtaq. The event raised £1500 for The Well Foundation.

Nominees and winners

2016 event
On 28 January 2016, the fourth annual British Muslim Awards presented by Al Rayan Bank was held at the Holiday Inn Birmingham City Centre. The event was hosted by presenter Inayat Kanji and was a celebration of success, with around 400 guests.

Nominees and winners

2017 event
On 25 January 2017, the fifth annual British Muslim Awards took place where the winners were announced at the Athena Hotel in Leicester. The evening was hosted by the television presenter and broadcaster journalist Samina Kiyani and the presenter, actor and voiceover artist Inayat Kanji. The celebration was welcomed over 400 guests. The awards also raised money for the National Zakat Foundation.

Nominees and winners

See also
British Muslims
List of British Muslims

References

External links

Farooq Awan, Talat. Celebrating Achievement and Success: The first British Muslim Awards take place in Manchester. BBC Manchester. 5 February 2013
Porter, Rob. Listen: Community Gets Ready for British Muslim Awards. Sunrise Radio. January 2013

Awards established in 2013
2013 establishments in the United Kingdom
British awards
British Muslims
Annual events in England
Islamic awards